East Barito Regency is one of the thirteen regencies which comprise the Central Kalimantan Province on the island of Kalimantan (Borneo), Indonesia. The town of Tamiang Layang is the capital of East Barito Regency, which covers an area of 3,834 km2. The population of East Barito Regency was 97,372 at the 2010 Census and 113,229 at the 2020 Census; the official estimate as at mid 2021 was 114,243.

Administrative Districts 
East Barito Regency consists of ten districts (kecamatan), tabulated below with their areas and their population totals from the 2010 Census and the 2020 Census, together with the official estimates as at mid 2021. The table also includes the locations of the district administrative centres, the number of administrative villages (rural desa and urban kelurahan) in each district, and its postal codes.

Note: (a) the village of Magantis has a postcode of 73612, Matabu of 73613, Dorong of 73614, Harang of 73615, while seven villages share 73617 and six villages share 73618.

Demographics 
Religion as of the Indonesia 2010 census:
Muslim  51.0%
Protestant  35.3%
Roman Catholic  8.1%
Hindu  0.4%
Buddhist  0.0%
Confucian  0.0%
Other  4.9%
Not asked or not stated  0.3%

Climate
Tamiang Layang has a tropical rainforest climate (Af) with heavy rainfall from October to June and moderate rainfall from July to September.

External links

References 

Regencies of Central Kalimantan